In cryptography, a keyring stores known encryption keys (and, in some cases, passwords). For example, GNU Privacy Guard makes use of keyrings.

See also 
 Java KeyStore

References

Cryptography